"Do You Hear the People Sing?" ("", literally To the Will of the People, in the original French version) is one of the principal and most recognisable songs from the 1980 musical Les Misérables. It is sung twice in the stage musical.

Overview
The song, composed by Claude-Michel Schönberg (music), Alain Boublil and Jean-Marc Natel (original French lyrics), and Herbert Kretzmer (English lyrics) is first sung in Act I by Enjolras and the other students at the ABC Cafe as they prepare themselves to launch a rebellion in the streets of Paris during the funeral procession of General Jean Maximilien Lamarque. The song is sung again in the finale as the final song of the musical. This second version, which immediately follows a number by Jean Valjean and others, is sung by the entire cast with revised lyrics, and becomes progressively louder with each stanza.

The song is a revolutionary call for people to overcome adversity. The "barricades" referred to in the song are erected by the rebel students in the streets of Paris in the musical's second act. They are to draw the National Guard into combat and ignite a civilian uprising to overthrow the government, but their rebellion eventually fails.

Use in various languages
The original French version of the musical did not end with the full ensemble singing this song; It only later became the musical's finale song when it was revamped for the English-language version.
Each actor sang a line of the song in his own language. The languages sung were English, French, German, Japanese, Hungarian, Swedish, Polish, Dutch, Norwegian, Czech, Danish, and Icelandic.
Another unofficial adaptation of "Do You Hear the People Sing?" is in Turkish, named "" and sang during Gezi Park Protests.

 In Chinese-language speaking countries/regions, there are many versions of the song. A popular Mandarin Chinese (Standard Chinese/) version:  is a singable translation authentic to the original English lyrics. Other Chinese dialects include Cantonese –  and Taiwanese –  versions are mixtures of dialect translation from the English lyrics and specific references to corresponding political protests (see below).
In June 2013, in the aftermath of the Arab Spring, the song was adapted in Arabic and performed by all 27 contestants from across the Arab world on the final episode of season 2 of Arab Idol, and is titled "Hear the Voice of the Oppressed". Another adaptation was created by Fabrica, an Egyptian theatrical team, in Egyptian dialect. The song, among few others from the musical, was performed on Albernameg (episode 27 – season 3) and aired on 14 June 2013.

Use as a protest song

There are unofficial adaptations of "Do You Hear the People Sing?" in Cantonese and Taiwanese, intended as actual protest songs; better known versions include "Asking Who That Hasn't Spoken Out" (問誰未發聲), written in Cantonese for Occupy Central with Love and Peace, and "Lí Kám Ū Thiann-tio̍h Lán Ê Kua" (你敢有聽着咱的歌) in Taiwanese Hokkien.

The song can be heard in protests in Hong Kong as recently as September 2019, when students sang this song over the national anthem during a secondary school's opening assembly. The song was initially removed on music platforms including QQ Music in mainland China because of its widespread usage in anti-extradition bill protests, while its English version was later removed from those platforms.

Aside from the aforementioned Cantonese and Taiwanese Hokkien adaptations, The Telegraph said that the song "has long chimed with people protesting around the world", adding that it was heard at the 2011 Wisconsin protests, the 2013 protests in Turkey, and a protest against the opening of a McDonald's restaurant in Australia in 2013. It has also been used by anti-TTIP protesters who have interrupted TTIP congresses as flashmobs singing the song.

The song was also used in support of the Maidan protests in 2014 by the group Ukraine 2020, who released a music video for the song on YouTube.

In 2016, the song was used as a protest song in South Korea's nationwide Park Geun-hye resignation movement.

In 2017, the song was translated into Filipino by theater artists Vincent de Jesus, Rody Vera, and Joel Saracho, and has been performed at rallies to protest the killing of activists and drug suspects under Philippine President Rodrigo Duterte, and again following the 2022 Philippine presidential election. 

Iraqis involved in the protests in 2019 also released a video with the song used.

In September 2020, a number of MSLU students in Minsk, Belarus, were detained after performing the song in the lobby of their educational institution. The students were protesting after president Alexander Lukashenko's disputed re-election.

In April 2022, the song was used as a protest song in 2022 Sri Lankan protests against the government of president Gotabaya Rajapaksa.

In April 2022, a clip of the 2012 film version of the song circulated on Twitter in protest of the lockdown during the 2022 Shanghai COVID-19 outbreak. The clip was ultimately blocked by the Chinese government to stop further protest.

Use in politics
On 16 September 2016, during his presidential campaign, Donald Trump used the song in a rally in Miami under the parody title Les Déplorables, a response to Hillary Clinton's controversial "basket of deplorables" label.
On 15 November 2022, it was among the songs played before Trump announced his 2024 presidential campaign.

See also
 "Glory to Hong Kong"

References

Songs from musicals
Songs with lyrics by Herbert Kretzmer
Works based on Les Misérables
Protest songs
1980 songs